Ronti is a mountain of the Garhwal Himalaya in Uttarakhand India. It is situated on the western rim of Nanda Devi Sanctuary. It is 164th highest located entirely within the Uttrakhand. Nanda Devi, is the highest mountain in this category. It lies 2.4 km North of Nanda Ghunti  its nearest higher neighbor. Bethartoli  lies 6.6 km ENE and it is 8.4 km NNW of Trisul I . It lies 24.2 km west of Nanda Devi .

Climbing history
The first known attempt on Ronti was made by P.L.Wood's team in 1945 during their attempt on Nanda Ghunti.

The known first ascent of Ronti was made by Peter Aufschnaiter and George Hampson on June 5, 1955. They started their trek from Nandaprayag. They march through the Nandakini valley and crossed the Humkum Gala, 17,170 ft and climbed a pass separating Ronti from Nanda Ghunti. On 5 June They started early 6 a.m. and reached the summit at 1 p.m. and return to the camp at 5-15 p.m.

The first ladies expedition to mountain from West Bengal led by Miss Deepali Sinha.  The other members were  Sudipta Sen Gupta, Lakshmi Pal, Swapna Nandy, Swapna Mitra, Shila Ghosh and Indira Biswas. Mrs. Sujaya Guha, accompanied the team as manager and  Dr. Dipak Shinha was the only male member. They established Base Camp (13,500 feet) at Rajgher on October 19. They established three more camps. Camp I (15,000 feet) on the 21st, Camp II (16,500 feet) on the 23rd, and Camp III (18,200 feet) at the foot of the north face of Ronti on October 27. Miss Swapna Mitra and two Sherpas climbed the peak on the 28th October 1967.

Neighboring and subsidiary peaks
Neighboring or subsidiary peaks of Ronti:
 Nanda Devi: 
 Nanda Ghunti: 
 Trisul I 
 Bethartoli 
 Devistan I:

Glaciers and rivers
Nanda Ghunti Glacier flowing west to east and joins Ronti Glacier that flows south to north. both the glacier drains down through Ronti Gad and joins Dhauli Ganga that later joins Alaknanda at Vishnu Prayag. Alaknanda River is one of the main tributaries of river Ganga that later joins Bhagirathi River the other main tributaries of river Ganga at Devprayag and became Ganga there after.

See also

 List of Himalayan peaks of Uttarakhand

References

Mountains of Uttarakhand
Six-thousanders of the Himalayas
Geography of Chamoli district